Zinat-un-Nissa Begum ( 5 October 1643 – 7 May 1721) was a Mughal princess and the second daughter of Emperor Aurangzeb and his chief consort, Dilras Banu Begum. Her father had conferred upon her the honorable title of Padshah Begum.

Life
Zinat-un-Nissa Begum ("Jewel among Women") was born on 5 October 1643, probably in Aurangabad, to Dilras Banu Begum, Aurangzeb's first wife and chief consort. Her mother was a princess of the prominent Safavid dynasty of Persia and was a daughter of Mirza Badi-uz-Zaman Safavi, the Viceroy of Gujarat. Her paternal grandfather was the fifth Mughal emperor Shah Jahan during whose reign she was born. Zinat-un-Nissa had in-depth knowledge of the doctrines of Islam, just like her elder sister, Princess Zeb-un-Nisa and her younger sister, Princess Zubdat-un-Nissa Begum. She was educated by private tutors and scholars, and refused to marry, choosing to remain single her entire life.

Zinat was a partisan of her youngest step-brother, Muhammad Kam Bakhsh, for whom she gained pardon from her father on several occasions. Though her full brother, Azam Shah, had a strong disliking for him. She was her father's sole companion during the later part of his reign, along with his concubine Udaipuri Mahal. She was the superintendent of her father's household in the Deccan for a quarter of a century till his death in 1707. She survived him many years, enjoying the respect of his successors as the living memorial of a great age.

Contributions to architecture

Zinat-un-Nissa is known to have built fourteen caravanserais. At the age of thirty-seven, she undertook a project to construct a number of inns of the highway linking Awadh with Bengal. This effort of hers earned her the praise of her father. She also had the Zeenat-ul-Masajid ("Ornament of Mosques") constructed at her expense in c.1700 by the riverside wall of the Red Fort in Delhi, where she was buried. Tradition goes that she demanded the amount of her dowry from her father, and spent it in building the mosque.

Death
Zinat-un-Nissa Begum died at Delhi on 18 May 1721 at the age of 77 years.

Ancestry

See also
 Zeenat Mahal

References

1643 births
1721 deaths
Mughal princesses
Indian female royalty
Women of the Mughal Empire
Timurid dynasty
18th-century Indian Muslims
People from Aurangabad, Maharashtra
People from Marathwada
17th-century Indian women
17th-century Indian people
18th-century Indian women
Daughters of emperors